Conophytum longum, called the long-leaved cone plant, is a species of flowering plant in the genus Conophytum, native to the western Cape Provinces of South Africa. It has gained the Royal Horticultural Society's Award of Garden Merit.

References

longum
Endemic flora of South Africa
Flora of the Cape Provinces
Plants described in 1930
Taxa named by N. E. Brown